On 1 July 2010, members of two rival cartels clashed near the village of Sáric, in Mexico's northwestern state of Sonora, approximately 12 miles southeast of the little-used port of entry in Sasabe, Arizona. Local news media and officials in the Mexican government reported that the violence was the result of an ambush, organized by a group aligned with the Beltrán-Leyva Cartel to stop a convoy of over 50 vehicles of the Sinaloa Cartel from entering Saric. The Beltrán-Leyva group took up positions on a hill along the road outside of Saric, and as the convoy approached, laid down a devastating barrage of fire into the convoy below. Shortly after the fighting ended, Mexican police and military arrived to find the bodies of 21 dead and several bullet-strewn vehicles, mostly SUVs. Nine men were taken into police custody, six of whom received wounds in the shootout.

See also

 Mexican Drug War

References

Battles of the Mexican drug war
Sinaloa Cartel
Beltrán-Leyva Cartel
2010 in Mexico
Conflicts in 2010
Organized crime conflicts in Mexico
July 2010 events in Mexico